Bleed is the fourth studio album by German heavy metal band Angel Dust, released in 1999. The band took a slightly darker direction on the album, without losing the power metal melodies they explored with their previous studio album, Border of Reality.

Track listing 
"Bleed" – 4:39
"Black Rain" – 3:47
"Never" – 6:02
"Follow Me (Part 1)" – 4:30
"Follow Me (Part 2)" – 6:14
"Addicted to Serenity" – 5:05
"Surrender?" – 7:06
"Sanity" – 6:01
"Liquid Angel" – 4:44
"Memories" (bonus track) (Recorded during the "Border Of Reality" session in 1998, previously unreleased track)  – 4:52
"Temple of the King" (bonus track) (DIO Cover) – 6:32
"Nightmare (Extended Version)" (bonus track) (Original version on the 1998 Album "Border Of Reality") – 5:11

Credits 
Dirk Thurisch – vocals
Bernd Aufermann – guitar
Frank Banx – bass
Steven Banx – keyboards
Dirk Assmuth – drums

References 
Album info on the band's official website

1999 albums
Angel Dust (German band) albums
Century Media Records albums